Laramie is a station on the Chicago Transit Authority's 'L' system, serving the Green Line and the Austin neighborhood on the West Side. It opened on April 29, 1894, as a terminus of the Lake Street Elevated Railroad. Going eastbound, Laramie is the first station above Lake Street; the line follows an elevated embankment to Harlem/Lake and transitions from an elevated structure to the embankment immediately to the west of the station.

Station layout
The station consists of two tracks and two concrete side platforms. The entrance to the station is adjacent to the eastbound platform, with passengers accessing the westbound platform via a bridge over the tracks. However, there are exit-only staircases on the westbound platform for disembarking passengers.

Bus connections 
CTA
  57 Laramie

Notes and references

Notes

References

External links
 Laramie Station Page
Laramie Avenue entrance from Google Maps Street View

CTA Green Line stations
Railway stations in the United States opened in 1894